Martine Rødseth (born 13 November 1991) is a Norwegian flight attendant, receptionist and beauty pageant titleholder who was crowned Miss Norway 2015 and represented her country at the Miss Universe 2015 pageant.

Miss Norway 2015 
On 30 August 2015 Martine was crowned Miss Norway 2015. She represented Nord-Odal, Hedmark at the pageant held at Åpen Scene in Oslo. At the same event, Cecilie Andrea Røising was crowned as first runner-up whereas Sonia Singh was awarded with second runner-up. Martine Rødseth competed 2014 as well where she was declared fourth runner-up and Elise Dalby of Hedmark took the title of Miss Norway.

On 20 December 2015 Rødseth participated in the Miss Universe 2015 pageant held in Las Vegas, United States as her country's representative.

References

External links

Official website

Living people
Norwegian female models
1991 births
Norwegian beauty pageant winners
Miss Universe 2015 contestants
Flight attendants